Tetsumi Takara (高良鉄美, born January 15, 1954) is a Japanese politician currently serving as a member of the National Diet in the House of Councillors. He was elected on July 27, 2019, representing the Okinawa at-large district which encompasses the entirety of Okinawa Prefecture.

Political career 
Takara has expressed his disapproval towards the relocation of Marine Corps Air Station Futenma, saying “ I feel the weight of duty. I will bring attention to the issue of Henoko not being Okinawa’s problem, but a problem facing the whole of Japan“.

In the House of Councillors, he and fellow Okinawa representative Yōichi Iha form the Okinawa Whirlwind (沖縄の風) faction.

References 

Ryukyuan people
People from Okinawa Prefecture
Japanese politicians of Ryukyuan descent
Living people
1954 births